Nellie Halstead (19 September 1910 – 11 November 1991) was an English track and field athlete who competed for Great Britain in the 1932 Summer Olympics in Los Angeles. She was born in Radcliffe, Lancashire and died in Bury. She was a member of Bury Athletic Club and Radcliffe Athletic Club.

Athletics career
She won gold medals in the 60 metres and 200 metres at the Olympics of Grace in 1931.

She competed for Great Britain as one of Britain's first women track Olympians in the 1932 Summer Olympics held in Los Angeles, where in the 4×100 metres she won the bronze medal with her team mates Eileen Hiscock, Gwendoline Porter and Violet Webb (replacing the injured Ethel Johnson).

At the 1934 Empire Games she was a member of the English relay team which won the gold medal in the 110-220-110 yards relay event and the silver medal in the 220-110-220-110 yards relay competition (with Eileen Hiscock, Halstead, Ethel Johnson and Ivy Walker). In the 220 yards she won the bronze medal.

According to historian Jean Williams, Halstead also played as a centre forward for the Dick, Kerr's Ladies football team.

She also competed in the 1.9-mile women's race before the International Cross Country Championships, winning the title for England.

Personal life
At the 1934 Games, her sibling Edwin Halstead (then Edith Halstead) also won a silver medal.

References

1910 births
1991 deaths
People from Radcliffe, Greater Manchester
Sportspeople from Greater Manchester
English female sprinters
British female sprinters
Olympic athletes of Great Britain
Olympic bronze medallists for Great Britain
Athletes (track and field) at the 1932 Summer Olympics
English Olympic medallists
Commonwealth Games gold medallists for England
Commonwealth Games silver medallists for England
Commonwealth Games bronze medallists for England
Commonwealth Games medallists in athletics
Athletes (track and field) at the 1934 British Empire Games
English women's footballers
Dick, Kerr's Ladies F.C. players
International Cross Country Championships winners
Medalists at the 1932 Summer Olympics
Olympic bronze medalists in athletics (track and field)
Women's association football forwards
Women's World Games medalists
Olympic female sprinters
Medallists at the 1934 British Empire Games